Alton Gansky is an American novelist in the Christian fiction genre. He has written 6 non-fiction books and 23 novels, three of which were co-authored with former Army Ranger Jeff Struecker. In 2012 Gansky and Struecker's Fallen Angel was honored as the American Christian Fiction Writers' "top thriller" of that year.

Bibliography

Fiction
Ridgeline Mystery series
 Marked for Mercy (1998)
 A Small Dose of Murder (1999)

J.D. Stanton series
 A Ship Possessed (1999)
 Vanished (2000) 
 Out of Time (2003)

Perry Sachs series
A Treasure Deep (2003) 
Beneath the Ice (2004)
Submerged (2005)

Madison Glenn series
 The Incumbent (2004)
 Before Another Dies (2005) 
 Director's Cut (2005)

Other
 By My Hands (1996)
 Through My Eyes (1997)
 Tarnished Image (1998)
 Terminal Justice (1998)
 Distant Memory (2000)
 Prodigy, the (2001)  
 Dark Moon (2002)  
 Zero-G (2007) 
 Finder's Fee (2007)
 Crime Scene Jerusalem (2007)
 Angel (2007)
 The Bell Messenger (2008, with Robert Cornuke)
 Enoch (2008)

With Major Jeff Struecker

 Certain Jeopardy (2009)
 Blaze of Glory (2010)
 Fallen Angel (2011)

Non-Fiction
 Uncovering the Bible's Greatest Mysteries
 Uncovering God's Mysterious Ways
 The Secrets God Kept
 In His Words
 What Really Matters Most
 40 Days
 The Solomon Secret (with Bruce Fleet)
"The Ultimate Guide To Jesus" (Copyright 2008 by GRQ, Inc.)

References

External links
Official website
Alton Gansky at Internet Book List

20th-century American novelists
21st-century American novelists
American male novelists
Living people
Businesspeople from California
20th-century American male writers
21st-century American male writers
Year of birth missing (living people)